Keith Edward Carney (born February 3, 1970) is an American former professional ice hockey defenseman. He last played for the Minnesota Wild of the National Hockey League (NHL) in the 2007–08 season.

Playing career
Keith Carney was drafted 76th overall in the 1988 NHL Entry Draft by the Buffalo Sabres, after attending the prestigious Mount Saint Charles Academy. He then played for the University of Maine. On March 8, 1992, Keith made his NHL debut in a match against the New York Islanders. Two weeks later on March 22, he scored his first goal in the NHL against the Chicago Blackhawks. After playing 14 games that rookie season, he then played 30 games at the NHL level the following campaign.

He was traded from Chicago to the Phoenix Coyotes in 1998 for Chad Kilger and Jayson More. He played for the Team USA during the 1998 Winter Olympics.

In the summer of 2001, Keith was traded by Phoenix to the Mighty Ducks of Anaheim for a 2nd-round pick in the 2001 NHL Entry Draft.

On March 9, 2006, he was traded to the Vancouver Canucks in exchange for a second-round draft pick and defensemen Brett Skinner.

On July 1, 2006, he signed a 2-year, $4.2 million contract with the Minnesota Wild.

Carney was captain of the Minnesota Wild in December 2006.

In his 2006-07 regular season with the Minnesota Wild, he set a Minnesota Wild franchise record in Plus/minus finishing the season with a +22.

On February 24, 2008, Keith Carney played in his 1,000th NHL game, becoming only the 29th American (14th active defenseman at the time, and since the conclusion of the 2007/2008 NHL season) to accomplish this honor.

On April 11, 2008, in game 2 of the Western Conference Quarterfinals against the Colorado Avalanche, playing with the Minnesota Wild, he became the oldest defenseman to score an overtime goal in NHL playoffs history at 38 years of age.

On November 11, 2008, Keith Carney retired after 17 years in the NHL. Keith and his family live in Paradise Valley, Arizona.

On January 15, 2009, Carney signed a playoffs contract with Swiss National League club SC Bern.

In September 2009, he accepted an invitation to the Vancouver Canucks main training camp to try to earn an NHL contract.  After further reflection he decided instead to retire for a second time. He was a scout for the Chicago Blackhawks from 2009 to 2011, and received a Stanley Cup ring with the Blackhawks in 2010. He currently coaches a youth hockey team in Paradise Valley, Arizona.

Awards and honors

Career statistics

Regular season and playoffs

International

See also
List of NHL players with 1000 games played

References

External links
 

1970 births
American men's ice hockey defensemen
American expatriate sportspeople in Switzerland
Buffalo Sabres draft picks
Buffalo Sabres players
Chicago Blackhawks players
Living people
Olympic ice hockey players of the United States
Ice hockey players at the 1998 Winter Olympics
Indianapolis Ice players
Maine Black Bears men's ice hockey players
Mighty Ducks of Anaheim players
Minnesota Wild players
Phoenix Coyotes players
Rochester Americans players
Vancouver Canucks players
SC Bern players
Ice hockey people from Providence, Rhode Island
Mount Saint Charles Academy alumni
AHCA Division I men's ice hockey All-Americans